"Feelins'" is a song written by Troy Seals, Will Jennings and Don Goodman, and recorded by American country music artists Conway Twitty and Loretta Lynn as a duet. It was released in June 1975 as the first single and title track from the album Feelins'. The song was the fifth and final number one for the duo of Conway Twitty and Loretta Lynn. The single stayed at number one for one week and spent a total of 13 weeks on the chart.

Chart performance

References

1975 singles
Conway Twitty songs
Loretta Lynn songs
Male–female vocal duets
Songs written by Troy Seals
Songs with lyrics by Will Jennings
Songs written by Don Goodman (songwriter)
Song recordings produced by Owen Bradley
MCA Records singles
1975 songs